Liu Jinchao (born 22 November 1994) is a Chinese rower. She competed in the 2020 Summer Olympics.

References

1994 births
Living people
People from Weifang
Rowers at the 2020 Summer Olympics
Chinese female rowers
Olympic rowers of China